Sixteen members of the International Cricket Council (ICC) fielded teams at the 2002 Under-19 Cricket World Cup in New Zealand. Only one team, Canada, was making its debut.

Australia

Coach:  Wayne B. Phillips

 Cameron White (c)
 George Bailey
 Aaron Bird
 Jarrad Burke
 Rob Cassell
 Beau Casson
 Daniel Christian
 Mark Cosgrove
 Adam Crosthwaite
 Xavier Doherty
 Adam Fleming
 Shaun Marsh
 Craig Philipson
 Craig Simmons

Source: ESPNcricinfo

Bangladesh

Coach:  Jalal Ahmed Chowdhury

 Mashrafe Mortaza (c)
 Aftab Ahmed
 Ali Arman
 Ashiqur Rahman
 Gazi Salahuddin
 Hasibul Haque
 Mohammad Ashraful
 Murad Khan
 Nafees Iqbal
 Shafaq Al Zabir
 Shafiul Alam
 Shariful Islam
 Syed Rasel
 Talha Jubair
 Wasseluddin Ahmed

Source: ESPNcricinfo

Canada

Coach:  Jeff Thomas

 Ashish Bagai (c)
 Soham Anjaria
 Christopher Argunen
 Umar Bhatti
 Travis Ganga
 Ajay Minhas
 Aneel Nauth
 Devin Persaud
 Gibran Rahaman
 Nathan Richards
 Glen Roberts
 Jonathan Roberts
 Jason Sandher
 Paul Ziesmann

Source: ESPNcricinfo

England

Coach:  Paul Farbrace

 Nicky Peng (c)
 Kadeer Ali
 Tim Bresnan
 Nick Compton
 Chris Gilbert
 Kyle Hogg
 Nadeem Malik
 Paul McMahon
 Gordon Muchall
 Samit Patel
 Stephen Pope
 Mark Pettini
 Alex Roberts
 Bilal Shafayat

Source: ESPNcricinfo

India

Coach:  Balwinder Sandhu

 Parthiv Patel (c)
 Chandrashekhar Atram
 Stuart Binny
 Manvinder Bisla
 Deepak Chougule
 Chandan Madan
 Mohnish Mishra
 Rakesh Mohanty
 Khanin Saikia
 Gnaneswara Rao
 Abhishek Sharma
 Tirumalasetti Suman
 Siddharth Trivedi
 Paul Valthaty 
 Suresh Raina

Source: ESPNcricinfo

Kenya

Coach:  Tito Odumbe

 Ragheb Aga
 Rajesh Bhudia
 Anand Gore
 Ashish Karia
 Jadavji Laxman
 Alfred Luseno
 Timothy Muange
 Nehemiah Odhiambo
 Morris Ouma
 Samson Ouma
 Kalpesh Patel
 Manoj Patel
 Rajesh Varsai
 Hiren Varaiya

Source: ESPNcricinfo

Namibia

Coach:  Werner Jeffrey

 Stephan Swanepoel (c)
 Ronald Cloete
 Michael Durant
 Hendrik Geldenhuys
 Olivin Glen-Spyron
 Michael Greeff
 Dirk Grobler
 Kirsten Isaacs
 Hugo Ludik
 Johannes Nel
 Paul Steyn
 Colin Steytler
 Burton van Rooi
 Tobias Verwey

Source: ESPNcricinfo

Nepal

Coach:  Roy Dias

 Pramod Basnet
 Bardan Chalise
 Prem Chaudhary
 Kanishka Chaugai
 Binod Das
 Shakti Gauchan
 Manoj Katuwal
 Lakpa Lama
 Basanta Regmi
 Sanjam Regmi
 Rohit Sharma
 Manjeet Shrestha
 Yashwant Subedi
 Basudev Thapa

Source: ESPNcricinfo

New Zealand

Coach:  Mark Greatbatch

 Ross Taylor (c)
 Simon Allen
 Michael Bates
 Peter Borren
 Neil Broom
 Leighton Burtt
 Brook Hatwell
 Stephen Murdoch
 Rob Nicol
 Iain Robertson
 Jesse Ryder
 Ian Sandbrook
 Jordan Sheed
 Richard Sherlock

Source: ESPNcricinfo

Pakistan

 Salman Butt (c)
 Amin-ur-Rehman
 Arsalan Mir
 Asim Munir
 Atiq-ur-Rehman
 Azhar Ali
 Irfanuddin
 Junaid Zia
 Kamran Sajid
 Kamran Younis
 Khaqan Arsal
 Mohammad Fayyaz
 Najaf Shah
 Umar Gul

Source: ESPNcricinfo

Papua New Guinea

Coach:  Vavine Pala

 Christopher Amini
 Peter Arua
 Greg Baeau
 John Boto
 Kohu Dai
 Mahuru Dai
 Clive Elly
 William Harry
 Frank Joseph
 Vivian Kila
 Gima Keimolo
 Mahuta Kivung
 William Mula
 Kalei Wamala

Source: ESPNcricinfo

Scotland

Coach:  William Morton

 Craig Anderson
 Kyle Coetzer
 Stuart Coetzer
 Alisdair Eccles
 Steven Gilmour
 John Gray
 Moneeb Iqbal
 Stewart Leggat
 Brendan McKerchar
 Robert More
 Zaheer Mohammed
 Stuart Murray
 Qasim Sheikh
 Harmanjit Singh
 Christopher West

Source: ESPNcricinfo

South Africa

Coach:  Hylton Ackerman

 Hashim Amla (c)
 Ryan Bailey
 Chad Baxter
 Stephen Cook
 Riel de Kock
 Zwelibanzi Homani
 David Jacobs
 Imraan Khan
 Rory Kleinveldt
 Brent Kops
 Ryan McLaren
 Ian Postman
 Brendon Reddy
 Greg Smith

Source: ESPNcricinfo

Sri Lanka

Coach:  Owen Mottau

 Dhammika Niroshana (c)
 Eshan Abeysingha
 Charith Sylvester Fernando
 Lasith Fernando
 Kanchana Gunawardene
 Damith Indika
 Dilshan Seneviratna
 Farveez Maharoof
 Jeewan Mendis
 Sumalka Perera
 Dhammika Prasad
 Daminda Ranawaka
 Upul Tharanga
 Omesh Wijesiriwardene

Source: ESPNcricinfo

West Indies

Coach:  Gus Logie

 Dwayne Bravo
 Narsingh Deonarine
 Alcindo Holder
 Lorenzo Ingram
 Gareth Matthew
 Ron Matthews
 Ryan Nurse
 Donovan Pagon
 Ravi Rampaul
 Darren Sammy
 Shane Shillingford
 Lendl Simmons
 Gavin Tonge
 Tonito Willett

Source: ESPNcricinfo

Zimbabwe

Coach:  Steve Rhodes

 Tatenda Taibu (c)
 Conan Brewer
 Elton Chigumbura
 Charles Coventry
 Andrew Durham
 Sean Ervine
 Stanley Marisa
 Hamilton Masakadza
 Stuart Matsikenyeri
 Alfred Mbwembwe
 Waddington Mwayenga
 Jordane Nicolle
 Sharezad Omarshah
 Brendan Taylor

Source: ESPNcricinfo

Sources
 Team averages, ICC Under-19 World Cup 2001/02 – CricketArchive
 Team lists, ICC Under-19 World Cup 2002 – ESPNcricinfo

ICC Under-19 Cricket World Cup squads
2002 ICC Under-19 Cricket World Cup